Joseph Bray Bennett (February 23, 1833August 17, 1913) was an English American immigrant, machine manufacturer, and Republican politician.  He was a member of the Wisconsin State Senate, representing Jefferson County during the 1879 and 1880 sessions.  He worked much of the rest of his life as a clerk in the United States Department of Agriculture.

Biography
Joseph Bray Bennett was born in Bolton, Lancashire, England, in February 1833.  He was raised and educated in England, and emigrated to the United States in 1863.  He settled briefly in Milwaukee, before moving to Watertown, Wisconsin, where he established a foundry.

In December 1869, he purchased a partnership stake in a machine factory business and became sole proprietor in 1873.  The business was then renamed Bennett's Thrashing Machine Factory, but was destroyed by fire in 1879.

He became associated with the Republican Party and served in several positions in the Watertown city government.  On January 1, 1879, Jefferson County's state senator Charles H. Phillips died on what would have been the first day of his senate term.  At the January 20 special election, Bennett was elected to fill the remainder of his term in the 1879 and 1880 sessions.  He was defeated running for re-election in 1880.

Former Wisconsin governor Jeremiah McLain Rusk became United States Secretary of Agriculture in 1889.  In the Spring of 1890, he hired Bennett as appointment clerk for the Department of Agriculture.  Bennett moved to Washington, D.C., and remained in this job until 1911, when he retired due to poor health.

He died at the home of his son in Washington, D.C., in August 1913.

Personal life and family
Joseph Bennett and his wife, Susannah, were married in England.  They had at least three children before her death in 1897.  Their daughter, Annie, died the next year.  Their sons, Reuben and John, survived them.

Electoral history

Wisconsin Senate (1879, 1880)

| colspan="6" style="text-align:center;background-color: #e9e9e9;"| Special Election, January 20, 1879

| colspan="6" style="text-align:center;background-color: #e9e9e9;"| General Election, November 2, 1880

References

External links
 

1833 births
1913 deaths
People from Bolton
English emigrants to the United States
Politicians from Watertown, Wisconsin
Republican Party Wisconsin state senators
United States Department of Agriculture people
19th-century American politicians